Fantasy Mission Force ( Pinyin: Min ne te gong-dui) is a 1983 Hong Kong horror action mo lei tau film directed by Kevin Chu and starring Jackie Chan (who got top billing in a supporting role), Brigitte Lin, Jimmy Wang Yu.  Although often marketed as a Jackie Chan film, he only appears in a few scenes.

Plot
Nominally set during World War II, the film begins with a Japanese attack on an Allied military camp, which a map reveals to be somewhere in Canada. After four Allied Generals, including one who introduces himself as Abraham Lincoln, are taken hostage by the Japanese troops, Lieutenant Don Wen (Jimmy Wang Yu) is called in to organize a rescue effort (rejected candidates for the job include Roger Moore's James Bond, Snake Plissken, Rocky Balboa and Karl Maka's character from the Hong Kong film Aces Go Places).

With promises of a huge reward, Don Wen rounds up a group of misfits for the job, which includes two kilt-wearing soldiers, a hobo (Old Sun), a supposed escape artist (Greased Lightning), con artist Billy, and the femme fatale Lily (Brigitte Lin), who sports knee-high red leather boots and a bazooka. En route to the Japanese base where the kidnapped Generals are being held (apparently located in Luxembourg according to the film), the group encounters two small-time crooks, Sammy and Emily (Jackie Chan and Ling Chang), who follow them in hope that they will lead them to a cache of money.

As they continue on, Don Wen is seemingly killed in a surprise ambush by spear-wielding tribesmen, and soon the group is captured by a tribe of cannibalistic Amazons led by an effeminate man in a tuxedo. After obliterating the Amazon tribe the group spends the night in a haunted house full of jiangshi before reaching their goal.

Once there they find the Generals held hostage gone and the base littered with the dead bodies of Japanese soldiers. Before the group can figure out what has happened they are attacked by sword and axe-brandishing Japanese Nazis riding in 1970s-era muscle cars.

Here the plot takes a turn for the melodramatic as the group is wiped out one by one by a machine gun, with another killed by a sword in the buttocks. In the end, with only Sammy and Emily left standing, Don Wen arrives, executes Old Sun, one of the rescue team members, and explains that he planned the whole thing from the beginning so that his rescue team and the Japanese soldiers would kill each other off, leaving him alone to collect the reward. Aiming to silence the last witnesses, Don Wen shoots Emily and Sammy is forced to fight him one-on-one.

After a long martial arts fight scene Don Wen is defeated as Sammy detonates explosives hidden in the main building, obliterating it. The Generals soon show up and demand to know why they were not rescued earlier, but all Sammy does is dismiss them with the line, "I don't know any Generals. To me you look like clowns!"

The film ends with a wounded Sammy and Emily driving off together in a jeep, and the Generals chase after them.

Cast
Jackie Chan as Sammy (supporting role) 
Brigitte Lin as Lily
Jimmy Wang Yu as Captain Don Wen
Pearl Cheung as Emily
Adam Cheng as Amazon Leader
Mary Wong as Amazon Queen
Sun Yueh as Old Sun
David Tao as Billy
Hui Bat-Liu as Stone
Fong Ching as Stone's Superior
Frankie Kao as Grease Lightning
Jung Fang as General
Paul Chang as General
Lee Kwan as General
Dan Yang as Japanese General

See also
 Jackie Chan filmography
 List of Hong Kong films

References

External links

 
Fantasy Mission Force at hkcinemagic.com

1983 films
1983 martial arts films
1980s action comedy films
Hong Kong action comedy films
1980s martial arts comedy films
1980s Cantonese-language films
Hong Kong martial arts comedy films
Films directed by Kevin Chu
1983 comedy films
1980s Hong Kong films